The China Conservatory of Music is a public music academy in Chaoyang, Beijing, China. The music conservatory was established in 1964, and currently co-funded by the Ministry of Culture and Tourism and Beijing Municipal People's Government. 

The China Conservatory is generally regarded as one of the leading institutions for the study of traditional Chinese music and traditional Chinese musical instruments, and it also has strong programs in music education research and other fields. Along with Central Conservatory of Music (also located in Beijing) and Shanghai Conservatory, it is one of the three most well-known higher education music institutions in China.  It is a Chinese state Double First Class University Plan university, identified by the Ministry of Education.

History
The China Conservatory of Music was initially established in 1956 by the merger of the art and music departments of Beijing Normal University, East China Normal University and Northeast Normal University. In 1964 the school adopted its current name after being influenced by Western music and arts students.

Notable alumni
 Dadon
 Gong Linna
 Peng Liyuan
 Wu Fei
 You Hongfei

References

External links
China Conservatory of Music official site

 
1964 establishments in China
Educational institutions established in 1964
Music schools in China
Universities and colleges in Beijing